Rockingham County is a county located in the U.S. state of Virginia. As of the 2020 census, the population was 83,757. Its county seat is the independent city of Harrisonburg.

Along with Harrisonburg, Rockingham County forms the Harrisonburg, VA, Metropolitan Statistical Area. It is also home of the Rockingham County Baseball League.

History
Settlement of the county began in 1727, when Adam Miller (Mueller) staked out a claim on the south fork of the Shenandoah River, near the line that now divides Rockingham County from Page County. On a trip through eastern Virginia, the German-born Miller had heard reports about a lush valley to the west which had been discovered by Governor Alexander Spotswood's legendary Knights of the Golden Horseshoe Expedition, and then moved his family down from Lancaster County, Pennsylvania. In 1741, Miller purchased , including a large lithia spring, near Elkton, Virginia, and lived on this property for the remainder of his life.

Much-increased settlement of this portion of the Colony of Virginia by Europeans began in the 1740s and 1750s. Standing between the Tidewater and Piedmont regions to the east in Virginia and the Shenandoah Valley and the area beyond (known in old Virginia as the "Transmountaine") were the Blue Ridge Mountains. Rather than cross such a formidable physical barrier, most early settlers came southerly up the valley across the Potomac River from Maryland and Pennsylvania. Many followed the Great Wagon Trail, also known as the Valley Pike (U.S. Route 11 in modern times).

Rockingham County was established in 1778 from Augusta County. Harrisonburg was named as the county seat and incorporated as a town in 1780.  Harrisonburg was incorporated as a city in 1916 and separated from Rockingham County (all cities in Virginia are independent of any county), but it remains the county seat.

The county is named for Charles Watson-Wentworth, 2nd Marquess of Rockingham, a British statesman (1730–1782). He was Prime Minister of Great Britain twice, and a keen supporter of constitutional rights for the colonists. During his first term, he brought about the repeal of the Stamp Act of 1765, reducing the tax burden on the colonies. Appointed again in 1782, upon taking office, he backed the claim for the independence of the Thirteen Colonies, initiating an end to British involvement in the American Revolutionary War. However, he died after only 14 weeks in office.  By 1778, it was unusual to honor British officials in Virginia, fighting for its independence. The same year, immediately to the north of Rockingham County, Dunmore County, named for Virginia's last Royal Governor, John Murray, 4th Earl of Dunmore, an unpopular figure, was renamed. The new name, Shenandoah County, used a Native American name.  However, long their political supporter in the British Parliament, the Marquess of Rockingham was a popular figure with the citizens of the new United States. Also named in his honor were Rockingham County, New Hampshire, Rockingham County, North Carolina, and the City of Rockingham in Richmond County, North Carolina.

Rockingham County is the birthplace of Thomas Lincoln, Abraham Lincoln's father.  In 1979 when the Adolf Coors Brewing Company came to Rockingham County it caused an uproar; some citizens thought it would corrupt the morals of the area while others wanted the new jobs.

In 2018, a series of strikes and protests were held in Dayton's Cargill plant.

Geography
It is the third-largest county in Virginia by land area. Large portions of the county fall within the Shenandoah National Park to the east and George Washington National Forest to the west, and therefore are subject to development restrictions. The county stretches west to east from the peaks of easternmost Alleghany mountains to the peaks of the Blue Ridge mountains, encompassing the entire width of the Shenandoah Valley. Rockingham is bisected by another geographic formation, Massanutten Mountain stretching from just east of Harrisonburg, VA to a few miles southwest of Front Royal, VA in Warren County, VA. Massanutten Mountain splits the central Shenandoah Valley as the German River and the North Fork Shenandoah River flow on its western side and the South Fork flows on the eastern.

Adjacent counties

National protected areas
 George Washington National Forest (part)
 Shenandoah National Park (part)

Demographics

2020 census

Note: the US Census treats Hispanic/Latino as an ethnic category. This table excludes Latinos from the racial categories and assigns them to a separate category. Hispanics/Latinos can be of any race.

Census 2000
As of the census of 2000, 67,725 people, 25,355 households, and 18,889 families resided in the county.  The population density was 80 people per square mile (31/km2).  There were 27,328 housing units at an average density of 32 per square mile (12/km2).  The racial makeup of the county was 96.58% White, 1.36% Black or African American, 0.13% Native American, 0.29% Asian, 0.01% Pacific Islander, 0.90% from other races, and 0.73% from two or more races.  About 3.28% of the population were Hispanic or Latino of any race.

Of 25,355 households, 32.90% had children under the age of 18 living with them, 62.40% were married couples living together, 7.90% had a female householder with no husband present, and 25.50% were not families. About 21.20% of all households were made up of individuals, and 9.10% had someone living alone who was 65 years of age or older.  The average household size was 2.61 and the average family size was 3.02.

In the county, the population was distributed as 24.60% under the age of 18, 8.70% from 18 to 24, 28.90% from 25 to 44, 23.80% from 45 to 64, and 13.90% who were 65 years of age or older.  The median age was 38 years. For every 100 females, there were 97.00 males.  For every 100 females age 18 and over, there were 94.30 males.

The median income for a household in the county was $40,748, and for a family was $46,262. Males had a median income of $30,618 versus $21,896 for females. The per capita income for the county was $18,795.  About 5.30% of families and 8.20% of the population were below the poverty line, including 9.10% of those under age 18 and 9.70% of those age 65 or over.

Education

Colleges and universities
 Bridgewater College, Bridgewater, Virginia
 Eastern Mennonite University, Harrisonburg, Virginia
 James Madison University, Harrisonburg, Virginia

Transportation

Railroads 
Rockingham County is principally served by Norfolk Southern Railway, a (major) Class 1 railroad and additionally, by the Shenandoah Valley Railroad, a short-line railroad.

Highways

Interstate 81 runs north–south and meets east–west Interstate 64 near Staunton to the south in adjacent Augusta County.

There are three major Primary State Highways in the county. (A primary road provides service which is relatively continuous and of relatively high traffic volume, long average trip length, high operating speed and high mobility importance). Interstate highways and primary highways in Virginia are maintained by the Virginia Department of Transportation (VDOT).

These primary state highways are:
 U.S. Route 11 a north–south roadway which Interstate 81 parallels, U.S. Route 11 follows an old Native American trail, later known as the Valley Turnpike.
 U.S. Route 33 is an east–west road which extends from a mountain ridge border with West Virginia across the Shenandoah Valley through Harrisonburg and Elkton. The bucolic Skyline Drive, which is part of Shenandoah National Park, has an entry point at Swift Run Gap and the Appalachian Trail also passes through nearby. The mountain ridge forms the border between Rockingham County and Greene County. (U.S. 33 continues east to Richmond).
 U.S. Route 340 in a north–south roadway which runs along the western slope of the Blue Ridge Mountains in the Valley.

Secondary roads:
As provided by the Byrd Road Act of 1932, secondary roads in Rockingham County are also maintained by the Virginia Department of Transportation (VDOT).

Communities

(Population according to the 2020 United States Census)

Independent city 
Since becoming an independent city in 1916, Harrisonburg is no longer politically located in Rockingham County, despite its status as the county seat.

Law enforcement

The Rockingham County Sheriff's Office (RCSO) is the primary law enforcement agency in Rockingham County, and also serves Harrisonburg. The agency is currently headed by Sheriff Bryan F. Hutcheson. On May 26, 2005 the RCSO was accredited by the Virginia Law Enforcement Professional Standards Commission (VLEPSC). On September 9, 2021 the VLEPSC Executive Board granted re-accreditation status to the Rockingham County Sheriff's Office.

Since the establishment of the Rockingham County Sheriff's Office, two deputies has died while on duty.

Politics

See also
 National Register of Historic Places listings in Rockingham County, Virginia
 Rockingham County Fair
 Rockingham County Sheriff's Office

References

External links

 Rockingham County
 Harrisonburg-Rockingham Chamber of Commerce

 
Virginia counties
1778 establishments in Virginia
Populated places established in 1778